Naseh Gowd-e Vali Khan-e Jowkar (also Romanized as Naseh Gowd-e Valī Khān-e Jowkār) is a village in Margown Rural District, Margown District, Boyer-Ahmad County, Kohgiluyeh and Boyer-Ahmad Province, Iran. At the 2006 census, its population was 83, in 18 families.

References 

Populated places in Boyer-Ahmad County